Ivy Lodge is a historic home located in the Wister neighborhood of Philadelphia, Pennsylvania. It was originally the home of John Jay Smith, founder of Philadelphia's Laurel Hill Cemetery and librarian at the Library Company of Philadelphia. According to an 1853 article in The Horticulturist, the building was designed by "an English architect" and was "carried out and improved by" Thomas Ustick Walter. It is a two-story, ashlar granite dwelling in the Italianate style.  It has a hipped roof with bracketed eaves, semi-circular arched dormers, and porch.

It was added to the National Register of Historic Places in 1972.

References

Houses on the National Register of Historic Places in Philadelphia
Italianate architecture in Pennsylvania
Houses completed in 1850
Wister, Philadelphia